Tea Hill Provincial Park is a provincial park in Prince Edward Island, Canada.

It is located in the town of Stratford.

References

Provincial parks of Prince Edward Island
Parks in Queens County, Prince Edward Island